U & Cube Festival 2019 in Japan is the first joint concert of 'U-Cube' that was established in November 2018 by Cube Entertainment and the Japanese subsidiary of Universal Music Japan. The concert takes place at Musashino Forest Sport Plaza in Tokyo. The event is scheduled nine months after United Cube Concert – One concert held at KINTEX.  The concert was attended by 6,000 fans.

Background
U & Cube Festival 2019 in Japan marks the agency's first family concert in six years since the "United Cube Concert 2013" in Yokohama in 2013.

Artist

 Lee Hwi-jae 
 BtoB 
 CLC
 Pentagon
 Lai Kuan-lin
 Yoo Seon-ho
 (G)I-dle
 A Train To Autumn
 Wooseok x Kuanlin

Set list
This set list is representative of the show on March 23, 2019.

VCR
 Young & One 
 That Season You Were In 
 Farewell Again 
 Hann (Alone) 
 Latata 
 Give Me Your 
 Senorita 
 Maybe Spring 
 Lemon (Kenshi Yonezu cover) 
 I’m A Star 
 Hypey 
 Black Dress 
 No Oh Oh (Japanese ver.) 
 Show 
 No 
 Gorilla (Japanese ver.) 
 Cosmo 
 Naughty Boy 
 Shine (Japanese ver.) 
 Big Wave 
 Swimming 
 Follow Your Dreams 
 Mermaid 
 Cube performance team 
 Beautiful Pain 
 Friend 
 Missing You 

 Encore
 Blowin’ Up 
 Upgrade

Media

Blueray & DVD
 2019 U-Cube festival Japan Blueray & DVD

Film 

September 6 - Aeon Cinema Ebetsu 
September 7 - Aeon Cinema Kohoku New Town
September 7 - Aeon Cinema Wonder Nagoya
September 7 - Aeon Cinema Ibaraki Osaka
September 7 - Aeon Mall Fukuoka

Notes

References

External links
 Tv 
 Apple Store 
 Android 

K-pop concerts